Chlamydastis lithograpta is a moth in the family Depressariidae. It was described by Edward Meyrick in 1913. It is found in Peru.

The wingspan is about 25 mm. The forewings are ochreous-white, sprinkled with light greyish-ochreous and with three small blackish spots on the costa at one-fourth, before the middle, and at two-thirds. The first discal stigma is small and black, with an arched pale greyish-ochreous cloud adjacent to it beneath. The plical and second discal are represented by white transverse ridge-tufts, the latter followed by a round pale greyish-ochreous cloud. There is a rather curved cloudy waved pale greyish-ochreous line from the third costal spot to the tornus, and a similar line between this and the termen, as well as two cloudy dark fuscous dots on the costa posteriorly. The hindwings are grey.

References

Moths described in 1913
Chlamydastis